A Century of Progress is a novel by Fred Saberhagen published in 1983.

Plot summary
A Century of Progress is a novel in which Alan Norlund is recruited into a war that involves time travel to the 1930s.

Reception
Greg Costikyan reviewed A Century of Progress in Ares Magazine #16 and commented that "A Century of Progress is based on a good idea which is not adequately exploited. As such, it is one of Saberhagen's lesser novels."

Reviews
 Review by Gene DeWeese (1983) in Science Fiction Review, November 1983

References

1983 novels